Easter Road is a football stadium in Edinburgh, Scotland.

Easter Road may also refer to:

 Easter Road (street), a main road in Edinburgh
 Easter Road railway station, a station in Edinburgh from 1891 to 1947
 Easter Road Park Halt railway station, a station in Edinburgh from 1950 to 1967